The Empty Cradle is a 1923 American silent drama film directed by Burton L. King and starring Mary Alden, Harry T. Morey, and Mickey Bennett.

Cast

Preservation
Although no prints of The Empty Cradle located are in any film archives, an abridgement exists.

References

Bibliography
 Munden, Kenneth White. The American Film Institute Catalog of Motion Pictures Produced in the United States, Part 1. University of California Press, 1997.

External links

1923 films
1923 drama films
1920s English-language films
American silent feature films
Silent American drama films
Films directed by Burton L. King
American black-and-white films
1920s American films